Richard Paris is a Canadian production designer and art director based in Vancouver, British Columbia.

With collaborator Linda Del Rosario and director Atom Egoyan, Paris worked on the films Speaking Parts (1989) and The Adjuster (1991). The three collaborated again on Exotica (1994), where Del Rosario and Paris were tasked to design a "lushly rendered tropical set". They shared the Genie Award for Best Art Direction/Production Design for Exotica.

Filmography
His films include:

References

External links
Richard Paris at the Internet Movie Database

Canadian art directors
Best Art Direction/Production Design Genie and Canadian Screen Award winners
Canadian production designers
Living people
People from Vancouver
Year of birth missing (living people)